Cyperus dactylotes is a sedge of the family Cyperaceae that is native to all of mainland Australia except for Victoria.

Description
It blooms between May and July producing green-yellow-brown flowers.

Distribution
It is found in creek beds, roadside drains and other damp areas in Western Australia, South Australia, the Northern Territory, Queensland and New South Wales. In Western Australia it is found in the Kimberley and Pilbara regions of Western Australia where it grows in sand-loam-clay soils. In New South Wales it is found from around the White Cliffs area to the borders in the north west of the state. It is usually situated in damp areas such as along stream banks growing in sandy to loamy or clay soils.

See also
List of Cyperus species

References

Plants described in 1878
Flora of Western Australia
dactylotes
Taxa named by George Bentham
Flora of the Northern Territory
Flora of Queensland
Flora of New South Wales
Flora of South Australia